Maksym Drabik (born 22 February 1998) is an international speedway rider from Poland.

Speedway career 
Drabik won the gold medal at the World Under-21 Championship in the 2017 Individual Speedway Junior World Championship and the 2019 Individual Speedway Junior World Championship.

In 2021, he was banned for breaking anti-doping rules (vitamin injection) by the Polish Doping Agency, the ban was back dated from 30 October 2020 (when he was initially suspended) to the 30 October 2021. In 2022, he helped Lublin win the 2022 Ekstraliga.

World final appearances

World Under-21 Championship
 2015 - 15th - 10pts
 2016 - =21st - 0pts
 2017 - 1st - 49pts
 2018 - 2nd - 54pts
 2019 - 1st - 49pts

Family
His father Sławomir Drabik was also a Polish international speedway rider.

References 

1998 births
Polish speedway riders
Living people